Pågen is a Swedish bakery company founded in 1878 by Anders and Matilda Påhlsson. The company started off as a small bakery in Malmö, in the southern province of Scania. Their bakeries are run by around, 1350 employees, and are located in Malmö and Gothenburg. Their products include brands such as Krisprolls and various types of bread, pastries and cookies. With key export markets in France, Great Britain and Belgium, Pågen is currently one of Sweden's leading food exporters with an annual turnover of around 220 million Euros.

Name
Pågen is the definite form of the word påg, meaning boy in the Scanian dialect.

Culture
Pågen marketed their 'Tosca Pågar' cookies as 'Florentine Pogens' in the United States until 1992, and Frank Zappa wrote a song called 'Florentine Pogen', with the opening line "She was the daughter of a wealthy Florentine Pogen", which was released on the album One Size Fits All.

References

External links 
Pågen — Official website

Food and drink companies of Sweden
Food and drink companies established in 1878
Purveyors to the Court of Sweden
Companies based in Malmö
Swedish brands
19th-century establishments in Skåne County